Armenian may refer to:

 Something of, from, or related to Armenia, a country in the South Caucasus region of Eurasia
 Armenians, the national people of Armenia, or people of Armenian descent
 Armenian Diaspora, Armenian communities across the world
 Armenian language, the Indo-European language spoken by the Armenian people
 Armenian alphabet, the alphabetic script used to write Armenian
 Armenian (Unicode block)
 Armenian Apostolic Church
 Armenian Catholic Church

People
 Armenyan, or in Western Armenian, an Armenian surname
Haroutune Armenian (born 1942), Lebanon-born Armenian-American academic, physician, doctor of public health (1974), Professor, President of the American University of Armenia 
Gohar Armenyan (born 1995), Armenian footballer
Raffi Armenian (born 1942), Armenian-Canadian conductor, pianist, composer, and teacher

Others
 SS Armenian, a ship torpedoed in 1915

See also 
 
 Armenia (disambiguation)
 Lists of Armenians

Language and nationality disambiguation pages